John Barry Talley (born July 22, 1943 ) was a musical director at the United States Naval Academy.

Early life and education

Talley grew up on a farm near Princeton, Kentucky. While attending high school, he studied piano at Bethel College and upon graduation, enrolled in the Oberlin College Conservatory of Music, graduating in 1965 with a major in piano performance.  For an additional year, he remained at Oberlin to complete a second major in choral conducting. His Oberlin teachers included Beryl Ladd and Joseph Schwartz (piano), Haskell Thomson (organ), and Hugh Johnson and Robert Fountain (choral conducting).

Barry next attended the Peabody Institute of the Johns Hopkins University in Baltimore, holding successive fellowships in music theory, piano, and choral conducting.   After earning his Master of Music degree from the Peabody Conservatory in 1967, he began a doctoral program, completing course and residency requirements by 1971.  His Baltimore teachers included Leo Mueller (orchestral conducting), Norman Johnson, Gregg Smith, Ray Robinson, and Theodore Morrison (choral conducting).  While in Baltimore, Barry also held a number of professional positions including organist/choirmaster of several churches and serving as conductor of an oratorio society, a German singing society, two music theatre troupes, and choral programs in three private schools—Bryn Mawr, Boy's Latin, and Garrison Forest.

Career

In 1971 he accepted a staff position at the U.S. Naval Academy as Assistant Director of Musical Activities with responsibilities as organist-choirmaster, director of the Academy's music theatre program, and Glee Club. The following year, Talley was promoted to Director of Musical Activities, a position he held for thirty-six years until his retirement in 2006.
 
The schedule of the Naval Academy was demanding, and work on a doctoral degree was suspended for a few years but in 1983, Barry received the Doctor of Musical Arts Degree from Peabody.  His dissertation, Secular Music in Colonial Annapolis, 1745-56  was received with such enthusiasm by the scholarly community that it was subsequently published in book form by the University of Illinois Press as part of their acclaimed series, Music in American Life. Although the musical ensembles of the Naval Academy consumed the bulk of his time, Barry continued his involvement with colonial American music through lectures, performances, and restaging of historic musical events, from balls at the Maryland State House to ballad operas at St John's College, presentations for the Supreme Court Historical Society and the Library of Congress, Maryland 350 celebrations, US Constitution bicentennial events, and various symposiums concerned with eighteenth-century American Culture.

Under Talley's direction, the Naval Academy Glee Club rose to a position of national prominence, appearing in many of America's concert halls including New York's Town Hall and Lincoln Center, Washington's Kennedy Center , and Dallas's Meyerson Hall; cathedrals, churches, schools, and colleges throughout the USA, and European tours that included England, Belgium, Sicily, and Italy.  Under his direction, the Glee Club appeared in more than one hundred nationally televised programs and were featured on NBC's Today Show, ABC's Good Morning America, the CBS Morning Show, numerous appearances on the Kennedy Center Honors, several U.S. Presidential Inaugural Galas, and a twenty-year run on NBC/TNT's annual Christmas in Washington.  In the course of these performances, Talley and the Glee Club performed with many of America's leading performers from stage and screen, representing the full range of music in America, from Broadway to the Metropolitan Opera to legends of pop, rock, and country music.  Many of these events included the President of the United States in the audience, and in the course of his career, Barry and his singers performed for virtually every president from Richard Nixon to George W. Bush.  A favorite at the Academy is the annual Christmas performance of Handel's Messiah, featuring the men and women of the Naval Academy, the Annapolis Symphony Orchestra and professional soloists, often drawn from the ranks of the Metropolitan Opera Company.  Several of these performances have been televised throughout the country on PBS stations, and abroad on the US Armed Forces Network.

The Naval Academy music program grew substantially under Talley's guidance. New ensembles were created that reflected an expanding interest in music and the changing demographics of the school.  These included a symphony orchestra, a pipe and drum corps, a gospel choir and a women's glee club.  Additions to the program included an annual spring oratorio, expanding the choral repertoire to include major works for chorus and orchestra such as Requiems by Verdi, Mozart, and Brahms, symphonies with chorus by Beethoven, Mahler, and Vaughan Williams and other major works such as Mendelssohn's Elijah and Haydn's Creation. In 1992 he established and acquired funding for The Distinguished Artists Series which brings performers of international stature to the Academy's Alumni Hall, performing for the Brigade of Midshipmen and the Annapolis community.  During the final third of Dr. Talley's tenure, the Glee Club began to appear with major Symphony Orchestras as featured guest artists; these included the Phoenix Symphony Orchestra, and Columbus Symphony, and the Charlotte Symphony Orchestra.

Barry was an ardent believer in the value of professional leadership for the Academy's music program, expanding its staff of 2 in 1971 to its present size of 19, with highly trained leadership for the Drum & Bugle Corps, the Orchestra, Women's Glee Club and Gospel Choir, music theatre, full-time office staff, professional singers for its chapel program and a dedicated ticketing operation.

Although primarily a conductor, Barry maintained a high level of keyboard skill, and was often heard playing the organ for Naval Academy chapel services and occasionally appearing as a concerto soloist with the Naval Academy Band.

Among his greatest contributions were the many musical arrangements he created for the choral groups at the Academy; music for the chapel choirs, special arrangements for specific programs such as a program of Depression-era music for a FDR commemoration, televised from the US House of Representatives before a joint session of congress and carried by all the major networks.  The scope and range of these arrangements can be heard on the many recordings available of Naval Academy choruses, primarily produced by Richardson Recordings.

He retired in December 2006.

Barry continues to work actively as a musician, directing Annapolis Music Festivals, working as an associate conductor with Encore Creativity's Chautauqua program in western New York, serving as a choral clinician, and filling in from time to time as guest organist at local churches, including the Naval Academy Chapel.

Discography

 Set Sail, 1991, Richardson Records, #70007.
 Musical Traditions in Navy Blue and Gold, 1991, Richardson Recording #70017.
 Eternal Father I, Richardson Records, 1991, #70001
 Eternal Father II, Richardson Records, 1995, #70006
 Eternal Father III, Richardson Records, 1996, #70021
 A Capella, Richardson Records, 1995, #70020.
 On Tour, Richardson Records, 2001, #70015.
 On Tour II: San Francisco, U.S. Naval Academy, 2010, #606259.
 Christmas Spirit, Richardson Records, 1992, #70002.
 Annapolis Sounds, Vol. 1, Richardson Records, 2008, #70003
 Annapolis Sounds, Vol. 2, Richardson Records, 2008, #70028.
 Over the Hills and Far Away, Being a Collection of Music from 18th Century Annapolis, Albany Records, 1990.

References

1943 births
Living people
20th-century American musicians
21st-century American musicians
20th-century conductors (music)
21st-century conductors (music)
Bethel College (Kentucky) alumni
Oberlin Conservatory of Music alumni
Peabody Institute alumni
United States Naval Academy faculty
University and college band directors
Musicians from Paducah, Kentucky
People from Caldwell County, Kentucky